Martin Henry Bashir (born 19 January 1963) is a British journalist. He was a presenter on British and American television and for the BBC's Panorama programme, for which he interviewed Diana, Princess of Wales in 1995. Although the interview was much heralded at the time, it was later determined that he had used forgery and deception to gain it.

Bashir worked for the BBC from 1986 to 1999 on programmes including Panorama before joining ITV. He presented the 2003 ITV documentary about Michael Jackson. From 2004 to 2016, he worked in New York, first as an anchor for ABC's Nightline and then as a political commentator for MSNBC, hosting his own programme, Martin Bashir, and a correspondent for NBC's Dateline NBC. He resigned from his position at MSNBC in December 2013 after making "ill-judged" comments about the former governor of Alaska and vice presidential candidate Sarah Palin. In 2016, he returned to the BBC as a religious affairs correspondent.

In 2020, the BBC's director general Tim Davie apologised to the brother of the princess, Earl Spencer, for Bashir's use of faked bank statements to secure his 1995 Panorama interview with the Princess of Wales, Spencer's sister. Former Justice of the Supreme Court Lord Dyson conducted an independent inquiry into the issue and concluded that Bashir had commissioned fake statements to deceive Earl Spencer to gain access to Diana and in so doing had "acted inappropriately and in serious breach of the 1993 edition of the Producers' Guidelines on straight dealing." Bashir resigned from the BBC in May 2021, citing health reasons.

Early life and education
Bashir was born and raised in Wandsworth, London to liberal Muslim parents from Pakistan. He converted to Christianity in his teens. His father had served in the Royal Navy during World War II. Bashir was educated at the boys' state comprehensive Wandsworth School, King Alfred's College of Higher Education, Winchester, studying English and History from 1982 to 1985 (at the time, degrees at King Alfred's were approved by the Council for National Academic Awards), and at King's College London, where he completed a master's degree in theology.

Bashir was one of five children, one of whom suffered from muscular dystrophy and died in 1991. Bashir dedicated his decisions in life to his late brother, including his appearance on The X Factor: Celebrity. Bashir said in 2019, "Every time I have faced a challenge I have heard him whispering saying, 'What excuse do you have? You have no excuse.'"

Career

BBC and ITV
Bashir worked as a freelance sports journalist before joining the BBC in 1986. He worked for the BBC until 1999, on programmes including Songs of Praise, Public Eye and Panorama. For Panorama, Bashir interviewed Diana, Princess of Wales in a 1995 edition.

In 1999, he joined ITV, working on special documentary programmes and features for Tonight with Trevor McDonald.

ABC and NBC
In 2004 Bashir moved to New York, where he worked for ABC, co-anchoring their current affairs show Nightline; along with Cynthia McFadden and Terry Moran, he took over Nightline from Ted Koppel in 2005.

In 2008, while working as a reporter for Nightline, Bashir was suspended from ABC News after making remarks in a speech at the Asian American Journalists Association convention in Chicago that were described as "crude and sexist". He said, "I'm happy to be in the midst of so many Asian babes. I'm happy that the podium covers me from the waist down." He continued and said a speech should be "like a dress on a beautiful woman – long enough to cover the important parts and short enough to keep your interest – like my colleague Juju's", referring to his ABC News colleague Juju Chang, a reporter for 20/20. ABC News suspended him. He wrote an apology to the journalists association which stated, "Upon reflection, it was a tasteless remark that I now bitterly regret. I … hope that the continuing work of the organization will not be harmed or undermined by my moment of stupidity."

In August 2010, Bashir left ABC for MSNBC, where he served as a political commentator and occasional substitute host for Lawrence O'Donnell, hosted his own programme, Martin Bashir, and was a correspondent for NBC's Dateline NBC. In January 2013, Bashir was criticised for omitting parts of Neil Heslin's statement in court, whose son was killed at the Sandy Hook Elementary School shooting, as he demanded a justification to carry assault weapons and asked to be challenged on the subject. Bashir did not include the request for challenge, describing an individual's response citing the Second Amendment as "a father's grief interrupted by the cries of a heckler." MSNBC later played an unedited video of the passage, stating that Bashir had meant to describe the interruption as heckling, not the response.

On 15 November 2013, Bashir criticised Sarah Palin for comments that she made comparing the U.S. federal debt to slavery. Bashir attempted to counter Palin's comparison by referencing the punishment of slaves described by slave overseer Thomas Thistlewood, specifically a punishment called "Derby's dose", and concluded by saying "if anyone truly qualified for a dose of discipline from Thomas Thistlewood, she would be the outstanding candidate". On 18 November, he apologised, stating among other things: "My words were wholly unacceptable. They were neither accurate, nor fair. They were unworthy of anyone who would claim to have an interest in politics." On 2 December, Bashir was suspended by the network; he resigned two days later, issuing a statement saying: "I deeply regret what was said, will endeavour to work hard at making constructive contributions in the future and will always have a deep appreciation for our viewers."

BBC religious affairs correspondent
In late 2016 Bashir returned to BBC News as religious affairs correspondent, succeeding Caroline Wyatt in the post. He left the BBC on 14 May 2021 after a period of ill health and shortly before the publication of a report from an inquiry into his 1995 interview with Diana, Princess of Wales.

Interviews

Princess of Wales interview

In November 1995, Bashir interviewed Diana, Princess of Wales about her failed marriage to the Prince of Wales for the BBC's Panorama programme. The programme was watched by nearly 23 million viewers in the UK. At the time, the BBC hailed it as the scoop of a generation.  The interview was an international sensation, and catapulted Bashir, a little-known reporter for a BBC investigative programme, to global fame.

Only five months later, two reporters for the Mail On Sunday broke the story that Bashir had landed the interview using falsified documents to manipulate the princess's family.  Nick Fielding and Jason Lewis wrote that Bashir had approached Diana's brother The Earl Spencer with bank statements which he said were proof that Spencer's former head of security, Alan Waller, had been secretly receiving money from a British tabloid, presumably to spy on Spencer and his family.
 
A BBC freelance graphic designer named Matt Wiessler told the Mail on Sunday that he had created the bank statements in about nine hours on Bashir's orders, and Bashir had used them to win the trust of the Spencer family and connect, through Charles Spencer, to Diana.  Wiessler said he had been told the documents were to be used as filming props, and after he began to suspect they had been used to deceive the Spencers, he spoke to Fielding and Lewis.

The article, which called Bashir's deception "an extraordinary breach of BBC journalistic ethics," prompted the BBC to announce an internal investigation of the episode.  The inquiry was headed by the BBC's news chief, Tony Hall.  Hall interviewed neither Wiessler nor Spencer himself, and the BBC quickly announced that it was clearing Bashir of all wrongdoing because the fake documents - which it did not deny had been created - were not used to secure the interview.

According to internal BBC documents that came to light later, Mr. Hall said that Mr. Bashir was “an honest man” who was “deeply remorseful.”  By contrast, he punished Mr. Wiessler by cancelling the designer's contract with the BBC.  Hall would later become the BBC's director general.

Twenty-five years after the famous interview, ITV aired a documentary about the case examining Bashir's manipulations, and the BBC's response.  In the programme, Matt Wiessler said that work dried up for him after the 1996 inquiry cleared Bashir, and said he had been made the scapegoat.

The documentary re-ignited the controversy about the episode, and the BBC director general Tim Davie apologized to Charles, the brother of the princess.  The Earl Spencer rejected the apology and demanded an inquiry. “I knew that Martin Bashir used fake bank statements and other dishonesty to get my sister to do the interview,” Spencer said, adding that the BBC had not only known of Bashir's unethical manipulation, but had “covered it up.”  Spencer told Davie he possessed records of all his contacts with Bashir which apparently imply the journalist told the princess false information to gain her trust. He said that Bashir had made false and defamatory claims about senior members of the royal family and, without the faked documents, he would not have introduced Bashir to his sister. Davie announced on 9 November the corporation was in the process of commissioning an independent inquiry. Michael Grade, a former chairman of the BBC, said that the allegations left "a very dark cloud hanging over BBC journalism".

At the time of the revelations about his interview with the princess, Bashir was seriously ill, which the BBC said had required postponing full investigation of the controversy.

On 13 November 2020, it was reported that the BBC had found the note from the Princess of Wales which cleared Bashir of pressuring her to give the interview. The former BBC royal correspondent Jennie Bond wrote in The Sunday Times the princess told Bond she did not regret the broadcast in a private meeting in late 1996. Diana said she feared a gagging order in her imminent divorce settlement, meaning it might be her only chance to give an interview.

On 18 November 2020, the BBC announced an independent investigation into how the interview was obtained, to be headed by former Supreme Court judge John Dyson. 

On 4 March 2021, the Metropolitan Police announced that they would not begin a criminal investigation into the allegations after a "detailed assessment" and consultation with the Metropolitan police lawyers, independent counsel and the Crown Prosecution Service. Later that month Bashir told the BBC inquiry that he was not responsible for spreading smears about the royal family to convince the princess to sit for the interview, and it was probably Diana herself who was the source of those claims. Among the smears were allegations of Prince Edward being treated for AIDS, the Queen suffering from cardiac problems and her intention to abdicate, and that the Prince of Wales was having an affair with his children's nanny Tiggy Legge-Bourke. Bashir argued that bringing up such allegations in front of Diana would have exposed him as a "complete fantasist" and narrowed down the chance of doing any interviews with her. Bashir added that Diana had revealed to him that she spoke with mystics and clairvoyants, who could have been the source of the false information given to her.

In May 2021, Dyson's inquiry found Bashir guilty of using "deceitful methods" and breaching BBC editorial conduct to obtain the interview. The Dyson report maintained that Bashir was "unreliable", "devious" and "dishonest".  After the conclusion of the inquiry, with which the BBC said that Bashir had co-operated fully, a broadcast of Panorama dedicated to the interview and the inquiry was scheduled for 17 May 2021, but was postponed after Bashir resigned.

The Metropolitan Police stated, "Following the publication of Lord Dyson's report we will assess its contents to ensure there is no significant new evidence." In September 2021, they announced that they would not be launching a criminal investigation into the interview.

In July 2022 the BBC made an apology to the ex-nanny in the High Court and agreed to pay an undisclosed amount of damages but thought to be in the region of £200,000 over the totally unfounded claims that she had had an affair with the Prince of Wales.

Michael Jackson interviews
In 2003, while working at ITV, Bashir conducted a series of interviews with American singer Michael Jackson, for the documentary Living with Michael Jackson, part of the Tonight with Trevor McDonald series for ITV, which Jackson's friend, Uri Geller, arranged. Bashir followed the singer for eight months. However, Bashir's colleagues have claimed that he  landed the Jackson interview only after promising him they would plan a trip for Jackson to Africa to visit children with AIDS, accompanied by Kofi Annan, the then UN Secretary-General; when this was put to Bashir, while under oath in a California court, he refused to answer.

Following the broadcast, viewed by 14 million in the UK and 38 million in the US, Jackson complained to the Independent Television Commission and the Broadcasting Standards Commission, accusing Bashir of yellow journalism. In response, Jackson and his personal cameraman released a rebuttal interview, which showed Bashir complimenting Jackson for the "spiritual" quality of the Neverland Ranch. After Jackson's death in 2009, Dieter Wiesner, the pop star's manager from 1996 to 2003, said of Jackson's response to Bashir's documentary:

Bashir later said during ABC's coverage of Jackson's death:

Other interviews and programmes
In 2003, Bashir presented a documentary titled Major Fraud detailing the story of British Army major Charles Ingram, who attempted to cheat his way to the prize money in an unbroadcast episode of Who Wants To Be a Millionaire?. The original programme featuring Ingram, recorded in September 2001, was withheld from broadcast because the production team quickly became suspicious. The documentary had a larger audience than Bashir's interview with Michael Jackson.

In December 2004, Bashir interviewed Victor Conte, the controversial founder of BALCO on ABC's 20/20 programme, in which Conte admitted to running doping programmes, which have broken Olympic records, as well as revealing that: "The whole history of the games is just full of corruption, cover-up, performance-enhancing drug use."

Bashir also conducted interviews with, among others, Louise Woodward, the five suspects in the Stephen Lawrence case, Michael Barrymore, Jeffrey Archer, Joanne Lees, and George Best.

Honours
Bashir and producer Mike Robinson received the BAFTA Award for Best Talk Show at the 1996 British Academy Television Awards for their work on the interview with Diana for Panorama. Bashir also won the Factual or Science Based Programme of the Year from the Television and Radio Industries Club, TV Journalist of the Year from the Broadcasting Press Guild, and Journalist of the Year from the Royal Television Society for the Diana interview.

In May 2021, after the conclusion of the Dyson inquiry that found Bashir guilty of deceit in obtaining the interview with Diana, the BBC decided to return the BAFTA Award.

Other activities
Bashir had a role as himself in the 2001 satirical comedy film Mike Bassett: England Manager.

He plays the bass guitar. He released a reggae album, Bass Lion, on 26 October 2010.

Portrayal
Bashir has been portrayed by Prasanna Puwanarajah in both Diana and The Crown.

Personal life
Bashir is fluent in English and Urdu. He converted from Islam to Christianity in his late teens after attending a church in south London, and identifies as a committed Christian, having been interested in Christianity as a child. While in New York he sometimes visits Redeemer Presbyterian Church.

He and his wife, Deborah, have three children. He has been diagnosed with a brain tumour affecting his pituitary gland, was reported to be "seriously unwell" with the coronavirus in October 2020, and reportedly underwent quadruple heart bypass surgery in late 2020 and further surgical procedures in spring 2021.

References

External links

Profile and Martin Bashir show at MSNBC

1963 births
Living people
ABC News personalities
Alumni of King's College London
Alumni of the University of Winchester
BAFTA winners (people)
BBC newsreaders and journalists
English Christians
English bass guitarists
English expatriates in the United States
English people of Pakistani descent
English reggae musicians
English reporters and correspondents
English television journalists
ITN newsreaders and journalists
MSNBC people
Panorama (British TV programme)
People from Wandsworth
Religion journalists
ITV people
Converts to Christianity from Islam